Yo soy Lorenzo is a Chilean telenovela created by Daniella Castagno, that premiered on Mega on September 2, 2019 and ended on May 25, 2020. It stars Mario Horton, Jorge Arecheta, Francisco Reyes, Vivianne Dietz and Sigrid Alegría.

The telenovela revolves around the impersonation of identities and the difficulties of female liberation and being gay in the 1960s.

Plot 
Ernesto (Francisco Reyes) is a powerful man who wants his only daughter, Laura (Vivianne Dietz), to get married. Laura is a young woman in her twenties who wishes to emigrate from the village and live freely away from there. What she does not know is that her father agreed with a friend from Santiago so that his son, Lorenzo (Jorge Arecheta), arrives at Vista Hermosa and conquers her. However, when Lorenzo travels with his driver Carlos (Mario Horton) to Vista Hermosa to seal the commitment, he confesses that he is gay and so they both decide to switch identities and this is how Carlos begins to be Lorenzo.

Cast 
 Mario Horton as Carlos González / Lorenzo Mainardi
 Jorge Arecheta as Lorenzo Mainardi / Carlos González
 Francisco Reyes as Ernesto Orellana
 Vivianne Dietz as Laura Orellana
 Sigrid Alegría as Jacinta Jofré
 Patricia López as Patricia Silva
 Rodrigo Muñoz as Horacio Álvarez
 María Elena Duvauchelle as Hortensia Arancibia
 Teresita Reyes as Rosa Jaramillo
 Mabel Farías as Margarita Jaramillo
 Ricardo Vergara as Jimmy Canales
 Francisca Walker as Nancy Álvarez Silva
 Paula Luchsinger as Blanca Noriega Jofré
 Constanza Araya as Gloria Arancibia
 Otilio Castro as Ismael Rojas
 Toto Acuña as Ángel Jaramillo
 Magdalena Urra as Ana Álvarez Silva
 Bastián Faúndez as Diego Pérez

Ratings

References

External links 
 

2019 telenovelas
2019 Chilean television series debuts
Chilean telenovelas
Mega (Chilean TV channel) telenovelas
Spanish-language telenovelas
2010s LGBT-related drama television series